Udo Schiefner (born 7 August 1959) is a German politician of the Social Democratic Party (SPD) who has been serving as a member of the Bundestag from the state of North Rhine-Westphalia since 2013.

Political career 
Schiefner first became a member of the Bundestag in the 2013 German federal election. He joined the SPD in 1975 and was elected chairman of the SPD Niederrhein in February 2021. In parliament, he is the chair of the Committee on Transport and Digital Infrastructure and a member of the Committee on Petitions. 

In addition to his committee assignments, Schiefner has been part of the German-Dutch Parliamentary Friendship Group since 2022.

References

External links 

  
 Bundestag biography 

1959 births
Living people
Members of the Bundestag for North Rhine-Westphalia
Members of the Bundestag 2021–2025
Members of the Bundestag 2017–2021
Members of the Bundestag 2013–2017
Recipients of the Medal of the Order of Merit of the Federal Republic of Germany
Members of the Bundestag for the Social Democratic Party of Germany